Jeewanthi Gunawardhana (born 29 December 1997) is a Sri Lankan rugby sevens player. She competed for Sri Lanka at the 2022 Commonwealth Games in Birmingham, they finished eighth overall.

References 

Living people
1997 births
Female rugby sevens players
Sri Lanka international women's rugby sevens players
Rugby sevens players at the 2022 Commonwealth Games